Cadmium hydroxide is an inorganic compound with the formula Cd(OH)2.  It is a white crystalline ionic compound that is a key component of nickel–cadmium battery.

Structure, preparation, and reactions
Cadmium hydroxide adopts the same structure as Mg(OH)2, consisting of slabs of octahedral metal centers surrounded by octahedral of hydroxide ligands.

It is produced by treating cadmium nitrate with sodium hydroxide:
 Cd(NO3)2  +  2 NaOH  →   Cd(OH)2  +  2 NaNO3
Preparation has been achieved from some other cadmium salts, 

Cd(OH)2 and cadmium oxide react equivalently.  Cadmium hydroxide is more basic than zinc hydroxide.  It forms the anionic complex [[Cd(OH)4]]2− when treated with concentrated base.  It forms complexes with cyanide, thiocyanate, and ammonia. 

Cadmium hydroxide loses water on heating, producing cadmium oxide.  Decomposition commences at 130 °C and is complete at 300 °C. Reactions with mineral acids (HX) produce the corresponding cadmium salts (CdX2).  With hydrochloric acid, sulfuric acid, and nitric acid, the products are cadmium chloride, cadmium sulfate, and cadmium nitrate, respectively.

Uses
It is generated in storage battery anodes, in nickel-cadmium and silver-cadmium storage batteries in its discharge:
 2 NiO(OH) + 2 H2O + Cd  →   Cd(OH)2  +  Ni(OH)2

References

Cadmium compounds
Hydroxides